Bernstadt is an unincorporated community located in Laurel County, Kentucky, located about  west of London, Kentucky, the county seat.

Its population was estimated to be 400 in 1997 and is the location of the First Evangelical Reformed Church, listed on the National Register of Historic Places.

References

Unincorporated communities in Laurel County, Kentucky
Unincorporated communities in Kentucky